Prasinoxena is a genus of moths in the family Pyralidae. The genus was created by Edward Meyrick in 1894.

Distribution and habitat 
Species in the genus are found across India and the Indonesian archipelago.

Species 
The genus Prasinoxena contains six species:

 Prasinoxena astroteles
 Prasinoxena bilineella (Hampson, 1901)
 Prasinoxena hemisema (Meyrick, 1894)
 Prasinoxena metaleuca (Hampson, 1912)
 Prasinoxena monospila (Meyrick, 1894)
 Prasinoxena viridissima (Swinhoe, 1903)

References

Pyralidae
Pyralidae genera